Trehafod is a village and community in the Rhondda Valley between Porth and Pontypridd in the county borough of Rhondda Cynon Taf, Wales, with a population of 698 in the 2011 census.(The earlier name Hafod  was altered in 1905 to avoid confusion with Hafod near Swansea. Until then, Trehafod (first record of the name is found in 1851) had been part of Hafod).

Administratively, Trehafod is split between the electoral division of Cymmer (Rhondda) to the west and Rhondda (Pontypridd) to the east.  A former coalmining community, the village is now the site of the Rhondda Heritage Park, a tourist attraction commemorating the Rhondda valley coalmining industry.

Spelling variants found in the past are Trehavod  (an English spelling, using "v" instead of "f") and Trefhafod (a hypercorrect Welsh form, using the conservative literary form "tref" instead of the colloquial, and more modern literary form, "tre").

History 

The 1847 tithe map of the area shows a number of farms on the area that was to become Trehafod; these were named, Hafod Uchaf, Hafod Ganol and Hafod Fawr. It was from these farms that Trehafod was to take its name.

"Hafod" is a Welsh word meaning literally "summer dwelling", and refers to an upland farm (from the practice of taking cattle up the hillside from the valley floor to graze in the summer months) (haf = summer, bod = dwelling, with soft mutation of [b] to [v] of the second element (bod) after a noun used as an adjective equivalent in attributive position (haf)).

Tre (literally “town”) was used in the eighteen-hundreds in industrial areas for a street or streets of workers’ housing (equivalent to English “town” or “ville”, similarly used).

Trehafod railway station lies on the Rhondda Line which follows the River Rhondda. The railway line and river border the village on either side.

Trehafod is now most famous for the Rhondda Heritage Park which was once the Lewis Merthyr colliery, at the peak time for coal mining production, one of the most productive collieries in the South Wales Coalfield.

Flooding
The village has frequently suffered flooding from the river, the most serious of which in 1960 claimed the life of an Afon street resident. (Afon is Welsh for 'river'.) Flooding also occurred in 1921, 1929 and 1979, after which the Rhondda River bank was reinforced. "The 1979 flood overtopped the banks of the River Rhondda just down river from Trehafod and floodwaters entered the low-lying areas of Colliery Street and Great Street causing flooding to many properties. A major river improvement scheme was completed in 1985 and no problems have occurred since then.
February 2020 also saw seriously flooding.

References

External links
Pictures of events in Trehafod
Trehafod
Welsh Coal Mines website - research the local pit history
Images, within 10km of Trehafod, Rhondda,Cynon,Taff

Rhondda Valley
Villages in Rhondda Cynon Taf
Communities in Rhondda Cynon Taf